Melaleuca tortifolia is a plant in the myrtle family, Myrtaceae and is endemic to a small area on the Northern Tablelands of New South Wales in Australia. It has egg-shaped, twisted leaves and heads, or short spikes of white or creamy-white flowers in December. It is classified as a threatened species.

Description
The leaves are flat but usually twisted, with 3 to 5 longitudinal veins.

The flowers are white, pale cream or pink in colour and are arranged in heads or short spikes on the ends of branches that continue to grow after flowering. The stamens are in five bundles around the flowers, each bundle containing 10 to 16 stamens. Flowering usually occurs in December and is followed by the fruit which are woody, almost spherical capsules  in diameter.

Taxonomy and naming
Melaleuca tortifolia was first formally described in 1984 by Norman Byrnes in Austrobaileya. The specific epithet (tortifolia) is from the Latin tortus meaning "twist" or "turn" and folium meaning "a leaf" referring to the often twisted leaves.

Distribution and habitat
Melaleuca tortifolia is only known from Barren Mountain near Ebor where it grows in heath in wet places.

Conservation
Melaleuca tortifolia is a threatened species listed as 2Rc-t in the ROTAP classification, meaning that it is rare but without any identifiable threat, and all the known individual plants are in a conservation reserve.

Gallery

References

tortifolia
Myrtales of Australia
Flora of Western Australia
Plants described in 1984
Taxa named by Norman Brice Byrnes